The 1981–82 Yugoslav First League season was the 36th season of the First Federal League, the top level association football competition of SFR Yugoslavia, since its establishment in 1946. The season began on 26 July 1981 and ended on 2 May 1982. Dinamo Zagreb led by Miroslav Blažević won their fourth title five points ahead of previous season's champions Red Star.

Teams
A total of eighteen teams contested the league, including sixteen sides from the 1980–81 season and two sides promoted from the 1980–81 Yugoslav Second League (YSL) as winners of the two second level divisions East and West. The league was contested in a double round robin format, with each club playing every other club twice, for a total of 34 rounds. Two points were awarded for wins and one point for draws.

Borac Banja Luka and Napredak Kruševac were relegated from the 1980–81 Yugoslav First League after finishing the season in bottom two places of the league table. The two clubs promoted to top level were Osijek and Teteks Tetovo.

League table

Results

Winning squad

Season statistics
Widest winning margin: 7 goals:
Dinamo Zagreb 7–0 NK Zagreb (13 September 1981)
Hajduk Split 7–0 Teteks (31 March 1982)
Most goals in a match: 9 goals:
Rijeka 5–4 Radnički Niš (23 August 1981)
Partizan 7–2 Sloboda (25 April 1982)

Top scorers

See also
1981–82 Yugoslav Second League
1981–82 Yugoslav Cup
1981–82 NK Dinamo Zagreb season

External links
Yugoslavia Domestic Football Full Tables

Yugoslav First League seasons
Yugo
1981–82 in Yugoslav football